The Saint Sava Serbian Orthodox Church is a church building in Enskede gård in Stockholm, Sweden. It was taken into use in 1991 but not officially inaugurated until 5 October 2014. It is the cathedral church of the Serbian Orthodox Eparchy of Britain and Scandinavia.

See also
 Serbs in Sweden

References

External links

Saint Sava Parish official website 

Serbian Orthodox church buildings in Sweden
20th-century churches in Sweden
Churches in Stockholm
Cathedrals in Sweden
Churches completed in 1991
1991 establishments in Sweden
Stockholm
Church buildings with domes